KHSV (channel 21) is a television station in Las Vegas, Nevada, United States, which carries various multicast specialty television networks on digital subchannels. Owned by Howard Stirk Holdings, the station maintains a transmitter on Black Mountain, near Henderson (southwest of I-515/US 93/US 95).

It was the flagship station of the Intermountain West Communications Company—which was founded by the late James E. Rogers—until the gradual sale of its remaining stations that began in 2013.

After Sinclair purchased channel 3 from Intermountain West Communications Company, the company stated that it would divest the license of either KSNV, CW affiliate KVCW (channel 33), or KVMY to a third party. On November 4, 2014, the existing KSNV-DT license was renamed KVMY, and KVMY was renamed KSNV; both stations simulcast KSNV's NBC programming on their main signals until January 1, 2015 when KVMY dropped the simulcast, and MyNetworkTV was moved to KVCW's second subchannel. Later that month, it was disclosed that the KVMY license would be divested to Howard Stirk Holdings.

History

Early years
The station went on the air as KLRJ-TV on VHF channel 2 on January 23, 1955; it was originally licensed to Henderson and was owned by Southwestern Publishing Company along with the Las Vegas Review-Journal and KORK radio (920 AM, now KRLV; and 97.1 FM, now KXPT). In September 1955, it changed its calls to KORK-TV to match its radio sisters, and soon after moved its city of license and studio facilities to Las Vegas. It has always been an NBC affiliate, but shared ABC with KLAS-TV (channel 8) until KSHO-TV (channel 13, now KTNV-TV) signed on in 1956. During the late 1950s, the station was also briefly affiliated with the NTA Film Network.  In 1960, the Donrey Media Group (later Stephens Media) bought the Review-Journal and the KORK stations.

In 1967, KORK-TV moved to channel 3 in order to operate from Potosi Mountain without being short-spaced to KNXT (now KCBS-TV) in Los Angeles, which also operated on channel 2; this move would also allow KTVN in Reno to begin operations on channel 2 on June 4 of that year. In 1971, a group of local residents led by Las Vegas attorney Jim Rogers began an effort to take control of channel 3. Rogers' group gained more support when Donrey began to heavily preempt NBC programming in order to sell more local advertising in the late 1970s. NBC was far less tolerant of programming preemptions than the other networks at the time. The most notable of these preemptions was the 1978 World Series, angering both NBC and several Las Vegas area viewers, some of whom filed complaints to the Federal Communications Commission (FCC). Facing pressure from both NBC and the FCC, Donrey was forced to sell the station to the Rogers group's holding company, Valley Broadcasting Company, in 1979. Donrey retained KORK radio and as a result on October 1, 1979, the TV station changed its call letters to KVBC, reflecting the new ownership (the change was made due to a now-repealed FCC rule that forbade TV and radio stations in the same market, but with different ownership from sharing the same call letters).

On March 6, 1972, KORK-TV's original building was completely destroyed by a fire, forcing the station to knock off the air indefinitely. Out of around 50 people at the building, no injuries were reported. As for the building, its microwave antennas were destroyed in the fire, and tapes and films NBC brought in were either damaged or destroyed.

In the late 1980s, KVBC's sign-on to sign-off ratings climbed to an all-time high, thanks in part to a strong prime time lineup by NBC.

Two major "events" aided KVBC's rise to the top. In May 1988, an explosion and fire rocked the Pacific Engineering and Production Company (PEPCON) in Henderson. KVBC ended up knocking itself off the air for a few minutes because its transmitter facilities atop Black Mountain were positioned just above the blast site. Once KVBC was back on the air, it was the first local station to continuously broadcast breaking news coverage of the explosion. Later that year, CBS produced 48 Hours in Las Vegas, a feature about Las Vegas that portrayed the city as full of gamblers and riddled by crime. In response, KVBC produced a one-hour documentary titled Las Vegas, Beyond 48 Hours, which painted a more realistic picture of "Sin City" and its residents.

KVBC was first to document The Mirage volcano explosion during its initial test in front of an unsuspecting nighttime audience.

With the digital transition completed, the station officially added the -DT suffix to its legal call sign on June 23, 2009.

As KSNV
On June 18, 2010, KVBC filed an application with the FCC to change the station's call letters to KSNV-DT, reflecting the renaming of Valley Broadcasting Company (which by this time, was a subsidiary of Sunbelt Communications Company that held the station's license) to Southern Nevada Communications, as well as better reflecting the station's relationship with sister stations KRNV-DT in Reno and KENV-DT in Elko. The change to KSNV-DT became official on July 9, 2010.

Jim Rogers died of cancer on June 14, 2014, at the age of 75.

Sale to Sinclair, license swap
On September 3, 2014, Intermountain West Communications announced that it would sell KSNV-DT to Sinclair Broadcast Group for $120 million. As Sinclair already owned a duopoly in Las Vegas, KVMY (channel 21) and KVCW (channel 33), the company planned to sell the license assets (though not the programming) of one of the three stations to comply with FCC ownership restrictions, with the divested station's programming being moved to the other stations. 80–85% of proceeds from the sale will go toward the formation of the Rogers Educational Foundation, which will support students and educators in Southern Nevada.

On November 1, 2014, KSNV began the process of swapping signals with KVMY; KVMY moved its MyNetworkTV programming to a subchannel of KVCW, which was replaced by a simulcast of KSNV-DT's programming. Additionally, the two stations swapped virtual channel numbers, which moved KVMY to channel 3, and KSNV to channel 21. On November 4, 2014, the call letters on KVMY's license were changed to KSNV, and the existing KSNV license changed its call letters to KVMY. These moves effectively put KSNV under Sinclair ownership, operating under the license for the former KVMY. Indeed, the licensee for KSNV still reads "KUPN Licensee, LLC"—reflecting KVMY's former call letters. The previous channel 3 license was later sold to Howard Stirk Holdings. A similar swap occurred during Sinclair's acquisition of WCIV in Charleston, South Carolina, in which its ABC programming and call sign were moved to another Sinclair-owned signal, and the previous WCIV channel 4 license (renamed WMMP, now WGWG) was sold to Howard Stirk Holdings, though the PSIP channel number was not swapped. Sinclair could not buy KSNV-DT outright because Las Vegas has only seven full-power stations—one too few to legally permit a duopoly. The FCC requires a market to have eight unique station owners after a duopoly is formed. With the sale's completion, Sinclair now controls half of those stations. It also created a situation in which a CW affiliate is the nominal senior partner in a duopoly involving an NBC affiliate and a "Big Four" station.

Cozi TV was dropped by the station on January 1, 2016; it was later replaced by Decades on April 18, 2016.

On March 7, 2016, the callsign was changed to KHSV. A month before, it switched to Heroes and Icons.

On June 1, 2022, MeTV was moved from KLAS-TV's subchannel 8.2 to channel 21.1, displacing H&I as the main affiliate channel to subchannel 21.2, as well as moving Decades to subchannel 21.6.

Newscasts
In 2003, KHSV (as KVWB) established a news department and began airing a prime time newscast at 10 p.m. It was part of Sinclair's centralized News Central operation that was based at the company's headquarters on Beaver Dam Road in Hunt Valley, Maryland. National and international news segments, weather forecasts and some sports segments originated from the company's Hunt Valley facility, while local news and sports segments were based at KFBT/KVWB's Las Vegas studios. The news department was shared with then-independent station KFBT (channel 33; now KVCW), which aired its own local newscast at 7 p.m. It also aired The Point, a one-minute conservative political commentary, that was required to be broadcast on all Sinclair-owned stations with newscasts. The news department was shut down at the beginning of March 2006, as were the majority of Sinclair's news operations under the News Central format.

KVWB later entered into a news share agreement with NBC affiliate KVBC (channel 3, now KSNV) to produce a nightly 10 p.m. newscast for channel 21. The newscast debuted on April 6, 2006, under the title News 3 at 10 on The WB Las Vegas and was later renamed to News 3 at 10 on MyLVTV following the September switch to MyNetworkTV. The 10 p.m. newscast originated from KVBC's studios on Foremaster Lane in Las Vegas near the border with North Las Vegas. The program was discontinued on December 15, 2006, and moved to KVCW the following Monday. That newscast was also discontinued on September 28, 2009, but was revived in 2015.

Technical information

Subchannels
The station's digital signal is multiplexed:

Analog-to-digital conversion
KSNV shut down its analog signal, over VHF channel 3, on June 12, 2009, the official date in which full-power television stations in the United States transitioned from analog to digital broadcasts under federal mandate. The station's digital signal remained on its pre-transition VHF channel 2. Through the use of PSIP, digital television receivers display the station's virtual channel as its former VHF analog channel 3. As mentioned above, KSNV moved their signal on November 1, 2014 to the digital channel 21 formerly used by KVMY. KSNV was one of the few major network affiliates to utilize channel 2 for their digital broadcasts; low-VHF channels have been very prone to interference in the digital age, though the relatively flat terrain of southern Nevada and northern Arizona made this interference much less of a factor than areas with varied terrain.

References

External links

HSV
MeTV affiliates
Heroes & Icons affiliates
Antenna TV affiliates
Decades (TV network) affiliates
Circle (TV network) affiliates
Start TV affiliates
Television channels and stations established in 1985
1984 establishments in Nevada